Victoria Peak Garden is a Victorian style garden near the summit of Victoria Peak in Hong Kong. The former Mountain Lodge, an alternate residence for the Governor of Hong Kong, was located there, which has since been demolished, but the park remains as an attraction at the Peak. It is managed by the Leisure and Cultural Services Department.

It is a vantage point which captures an over 300m high view of Victoria Harbour and the night scene of Hong Kong. The original landscape remains in the garden. Unlike most of the public parks in Hong Kong, dogs and other pet animals are allowed in the garden.

Future development

The Hong Kong government announced on 25 September 2005 that the site will be redeveloped along with the rest of the Peak area.

The ample open space, vast amount of grassy lawn and stream course at the site will be preserved. To bring out the heritage elements, the garden will be enhanced with Victorian style features including gazebos, benches, sun-dials and colourful flowers. Artifacts from the Victorian era, such as stone pillars and carvings, will be displayed to enrich the visitors' experience. 

The new pavilion will comprise four pergolas at the corners and Victorian colonnades to link up the pergolas. This will offer ample shade and a resting place for the public. The existing kiosk and toilet will also be reconstructed to boost the garden's Victorian ambience. 

The $142.6 million tourist district improvement project, scheduled to finish around the end of 2007, will help create three new tourism nodes - Mount Austin Playground, Gate Lodge and Peak Garden, on the Peak.

See also
List of urban public parks and gardens in Hong Kong

References

External links

The Film Services Office

Government buildings in Hong Kong
Landmarks in Hong Kong
Official residences in Hong Kong
Urban public parks and gardens in Hong Kong
Victoria Peak